VIT Bhopal University is a private university in Kothri Kalan in Sehore district, Madhya Pradesh, India. It was established by the Vellore Institute of Technology.

Academics 
School of Advanced Sciences & Languages
School of Bioengineering
School of Computing Science & Engineering
School of Electrical & Electronics Engineering
School of Mechanical Engineering
School of Architecture
VIT Business School

See also
VIT-AP University

References

External links

Private universities in India
Educational institutions established in 2017
2017 establishments in Madhya Pradesh